Rose Szabo is an American young adult novelist.

Life 
They graduated from the University of Maine and Virginia Commonwealth University.   They teach at Virginia Commonwealth University.

Their work has appeared in See the Elephant and Quaint.

Works 
 What Big Teeth Farrar, Straus and Giroux, 2021.  
 We All Fall Down, Farrar Straus Giroux, New York, 2022.

References

External links 
 Official website
 An Interview with What Big Teeth Author, Rose Szabo F(r)iction

American young adult novelists
University of Maine alumni
Virginia Commonwealth University alumni